In molecular biology, the cold-shock domain (CSD) is a protein domain of about 70 amino acids which has been found in prokaryotic and eukaryotic DNA-binding proteins. Part of this domain is highly similar to the RNP-1 RNA-binding motif.

When Escherichia coli is exposed to a temperature drop from 37 to 10 degrees Celsius, a 4–5 hour lag phase occurs, after which growth is resumed at a reduced rate. During the lag phase, the expression of around 13 proteins, which contain cold shock domains is increased 2–10 fold. These so-called 'cold shock' proteins are thought to help the cell to survive in temperatures lower than optimum growth temperature, by contrast with heat shock proteins, which help the cell to survive in temperatures greater than the optimum, possibly by condensation of the chromosome and organisation of the prokaryotic nucleoid.

References

Protein domains